A scara (plural ) was a contingent or unit of soldiers, possibly cavalry, in Carolingian armies. Sources, however, cite that this unit performed different kinds of military functions and is defined according to the specific operation it performed.

Etymology

The term is a Latinized form of an ancient Germanic word meaning "group", compare modern Dutch "" which can refer to a group or group of soldiers. Members of the scara units were called scariti, escariti and scarii. It is uncertain whether the scara was composed of regular units or an ad hoc force, with members coming from a larger military group.

Function

An account also cited that the scara cavalry performed as Charlemagne's bodyguard, securing his rear during campaigns.

References

Military units and formations of the Middle Ages